Marciana is a village in Tuscany, central Italy, administratively a frazione of the comune of Cascina, province of Pisa.

Marciana is about 15 km from Pisa and 2 km from Cascina.

References

Bibliography 
 

Frazioni of the Province of Pisa